Mmabatho Montsho (born October 19, 1983) is a South African fine artist , writer, actress and film director.

Biography 
Montsho was born in Soweto, Johannesburg. She had her senior high school education at Greenside High School and then furthered at the University of South Africa where she studied Audiovisual Multimedia.

While in senior high school, Montsho was interested in Fashion. She launched her very first label Black Olive Designs after completing high school. She collaborated with her close high school friends to grow the business by designing clothes and selling them at B&B Rooftop market. In 2004, their clothing line earned public recognition at the South African fashion week.

In 2006, she began her acting career, appearing as a guest on SABC 1's A Place Called Home

Filmography 
She has starred in several movies and television series, including:

 Jacob's Cross 
 Happiness Is a Four-letter Word
Artcha
Mr Bones 2: Back from the future as Wanita
Plein Street
Tempy Pushas as Noxy
Nothing for Mahala
Thula's Vine
Generations as Lumka
Rhythm City

Works 
She is the producer and director for the following movies:

 Frontières
 The Award Ceremony
 Joko Ya Hao
Nothing for Mahala
A hotel Called Memory

Awards 

 Awarded Golden Horn Award for Best Achievement in Script in a TV Drama
 2020 - Best Short Film - Worldwide Women's Film Festival in Arizona

References

External links 

1983 births
Living people
South African actresses
South African film producers
University of South Africa alumni
Alumni of Greenside High School